Emilce "Mimi" Sosa (born 11 September 1987) is an Argentine volleyball player who represents Argentina in international competition.

She participated with the Argentina national team at the Pan-American Volleyball Cup (in 2010, 2011, 2012, 2013, 2014, 2015, 2016), the FIVB Volleyball World Grand Prix (in 2011, 2012, 2013, 2014, 2015, 2016), the FIVB Volleyball Women's World Cup (in 2011, 2015), the 2014 FIVB Volleyball Women's World Championship in Italy, 2018 FIVB Volleyball Women's World Championship, the 2015 Pan American Games in Canada, and the 2016 Summer Olympics in Brazil.

At club level she played for Olimpico Freyre, Instituto de Córdoba, Boca Juniors, CSM București, Ştiinţa Bacău and Rio do Sul before moving to Esporte Clube Pinheiros in 2016.

Personal life
A Quechua descendant, Sosa was born in Ibarreta, a settlement in the Formosa Province (North east Argentina), during her first years she lived in the nearby city of Las Lomitas. At the time her mother was working in a Wichí community in the west of the province (around 300 km from Las Lomitas) and when Sosa was 8 years, she moved to the community with her father and siblings.

Her first sport was football, it was due to her mother influence that she took on volleyball when she was 14 years and started playing at Club Escuela de Comercio de Las Lomitas. She moved to Córdoba at the age of 16, after being selected to play football for Belgrano de Córdoba and was also playing volleyball at Club Universitario de Córdoba. Only when asked to decide which sport to follow, she chose volleyball. From Universitario de Córdoba she moved to Asociación Deportiva Atenas before starting her professional career at Olímpico de Freyre.

Emilce is openly lesbian and was married to Brazilian volleyball player Milka Silva.

Clubs
  Club Universitario de Córdoba
  Atenas
  Olimpico Freyre (2005–2006)
  Instituto de Córdoba (2006–2007)
  Boca Juniors (2007–2011)
  CSM București (2011–2012)
  CS Ştiinţa Bacău (2012–2014)
  Rio do Sul (2015–2016)
  Esporte Clube Pinheiros (2016–2017)
  São Caetano Esporte Clube (2017–2018)
  Brasília Vôlei (2018)
  Club Atlético San Lorenzo de Almagro (2020-)

References

External links
 Profile at CEV
 Profile  at Esporte Clube Pinheiros
YouTube
 Zimbio
Getty Images

1987 births
Living people
Argentine women's volleyball players
People from Formosa Province
Argentine people of Quechua descent
Volleyball players at the 2015 Pan American Games
Pan American Games competitors for Argentina
Olympic volleyball players of Argentina
Volleyball players at the 2016 Summer Olympics
Middle blockers
Argentine expatriate sportspeople in Romania
Argentine expatriate sportspeople in Brazil
Expatriate volleyball players in Romania
Expatriate volleyball players in Brazil
Argentine LGBT sportspeople
LGBT volleyball players